Robert P. "Bob" Dyk (March 6, 1937 – March 22, 2008) was an American journalist, reporter and correspondent.  Dyk worked for CBS News, ABC News and WMTW-TV during his career.

Dyk's career in network news began at CBS News as an editorial assistant at the 1960 Democratic National Convention. He moved to ABC News in 1978. He was sent to Tehran, Iran, by ABC to cover the takeover of the United States embassy and the ensuing Iran hostage crisis following the Iranian Revolution in 1979.  During his career at CBS and ABC, Dyk also reported in the death of Winston Churchill, the Lebanon Civil War and riots in Los Angeles.

Dyk left network television and moved to Maine in 1987.  He continued to work in television as a local anchorman and reporter for WMTW-TV.

Dyk died of cancer at the 71 on March 22, 2008, at his home in Falmouth, Maine.

References

External links
Maine broadcaster Bob Dyk dies
Foster's Daily Democrat: Bob Dyk, longtime TV and radio reporter, dies at age 71

2008 deaths
1930s births
People from Falmouth, Maine
American television reporters and correspondents
American television news anchors
Deaths from cancer in Maine
Place of birth missing